{|

{{Infobox ship career
| Hide header = 
| Ship name = *Doğu (1939)
Lüderitzbucht (1939-45)
Duala  (1945)
Empire Ock (1945-46)
Pyotr Velikiy (1946-48)Jagiełło  (1948-49)Pyotr Velikiy (1949-73)
| Ship owner = *German Government (1939-40)
Kriegsmarine (1940-45)
Ministry of War Transport (1945-46)
Soviet Ministry of the Maritime Fleet (1946-47)
Gdynia-America Line (1947-49)
Black Sea Shipping Company (1949-73)
| Ship operator = *Deutsche-Afrika Linien (1939-40)
Kriegsmarine (1940-45)
City Line Ltd (1945-46)
Soviet Ministry of the Maritime Fleet (1946-47)
Cosulich (1947-49)
Black Sea Shipping Company (1949-73)
| Ship registry = * Hamburg, Germany (1939-49)
 (1940-45)
 London, United Kingdom (1945-46)
 Leningrad, Soviet Union (1946-47) 
 Gdynia, Poland (1947-49 )
 Odessa, Soviet Union (1949-73)
| Ship route = 
| Ship ordered = 
| Ship builder = Blohm+Voss
| Ship original cost = 
| Ship yard number = 520
| Ship way number = 
| Ship laid down = 
| Ship launched = 15 March 1939
| Ship completed = 31 August 1939
| Ship christened = 
| Ship acquired = 
| Ship maiden voyage = 
| Ship in service = 
| Ship out of service = 20 November 1973
| Ship identification = *United Kingdom Official Number 180588 (1945-46)
Code Letters GJZR (1945-46)

Soviet Register Number M-2381 (1946-47, 1949-73)
Code Letters UVSA (1949-73)

| Ship fate = Scrapped
| Ship notes = 
}}

|}Jagiełło was a medium-sized passenger-cargo ship, sailing under the Polish flag between 1948 and 1949, and then decommissioned due to unprofitable and post-war political conditions, which were not conducive to the development of the Polish passenger fleet, and then transferred to the Soviet Union as Pyotr Velikiy, operating Black Sea passenger services until 1973. The ship had been built by Blohm & Voss for Turkish operators, taken over after completion by the German government. After World War 2 it taken over by the British and then the Soviet Government.

Description

The engines drove twin screw propellers via low pressure turbines and a double reduction drive.

 History 
The ship was built in 1939 as Doğu at the Blohm und Voss shipyard in Hamburg for the Turkish government organisations Denizbank and Denizyollari Idaresi. Yard Number 520, Doğu was launched on 15 March 1939, the first of three sister ships, the others being Egemen and Savas, and completed on 31 August. The ship had not been commissioned when war broke out in September 1939, was taken over by Germany, with Deutsche Afrika-Linien appointed managers, and renamed Lüderitzbucht.  In 1940 the ship was taken over by the Kriegsmarine, who used it as a residential hulk at Flensburg, renaming it Duala in early 1945.

Still moored at Flensburg in May 1945, Duala was taken as prize by British forces and transferred to the Ministry of War Transport under the name Empire Ock. The United Kingdom Official Number 180588 and code letters GJZD were allocated. The ship's port of registry was London and it was operated under the management of City Line Ltd. In the following year Empire Ock was allocated to the Soviet Union as part of German war reparations. It was given the name Pyotr Velikiy (Russian: "Пётр Великий", Peter the Great) and registered at Leningrad to the Ministry of the Maritime Fleet. The conversion back to a passenger ship proved to be too expensive, so in 1947 it was given to Poland.

After a year-long renovation in the Genoa shipyard, the ship was given the name Jagiełło and Gdynia-America Line colours, but never came to Gdynia. It was the only large passenger ship from the Blohm & Voss shipyard, operated under the Polish flag. For a year she sailed, in cooperation with the Italian shipowner company Cosulich and with a largely Italian crew (only a few officers and specialists were Polish), on the Genoa-Central America-Cuba-Lisbon route. Due to the unprofitable nature of the venture, the ship returned (probably free of charge) to the Soviet flag and to the name Pyotr Velikiy in 1949. It was owned by Black Sea Shipping Company, registered at Odessa, with the Soviet Register number M-2381 and code letters UVSA.Pyotr Velikiy was operated (alongside Gruziya'', formerly the Polish MS Sobieski), on Black Sea passenger routes, principally between Odessa, Sochi and Batumi. The ship was withdrawn from service and arrived for demolition by I M Varela Davalillo at Castellón de la Plana, Spain on 20 November 1973.

Notes

References

1939 ships
Ships built in Hamburg
Passenger ships of Germany
World War II merchant ships of Germany
Steamships of Germany
Auxiliary ships of the Kriegsmarine
Empire ships
Ministry of War Transport ships
Passenger ships of the United Kingdom
Steamships of the United Kingdom
Passenger ships of the Soviet Union
Steamships of the Soviet Union
Passenger ships of Poland
Steamships of Poland
Ships of the Gdynia-America Line
Ships of Black Sea Shipping Company